Hind Ka Lal is a Bollywood film. It was released in 1940. The film was directed by Homi Wadia and Ramji Arya. It starred Radharani, Sardar Mansur, Boman Shroff, Mithu Miyan and Gulshan. The music was composed by Madhavlal Damodar Master.

References

External links
 

1940 films
1940s Hindi-language films
Films directed by Homi Wadia
Indian black-and-white films
Indian action films
1940s action films